The 1955 Northwestern Wildcats team represented Northwestern University during the 1955 Big Ten Conference football season. In their first year under head coach Lou Saban, the Wildcats compiled a 0–8–1 record (0–6–1 against Big Ten Conference opponents), finished in last place in the Big Ten, and were outscored by their opponents by a combined total of 241 to 66.

George Steinbrenner was an assistant coach in 1955.

Schedule

References

Northwestern
Northwestern Wildcats football seasons
College football winless seasons
Northwestern Wildcats football